Actenoptila eucosma is a moth in the Carposinidae family. It was described by Alexey Diakonoff in 1954. It is found in New Guinea.

References

Natural History Museum Lepidoptera generic names catalog

Carposinidae
Moths described in 1954